Jean Hotteterre (1677–1720) was a French composer and musician of the Hotteterre family.

Hotteterre worked at the family workshop on the Rue de Harlay, Paris until his death at the court of Louis XIV of France. He and his brothers Jacques-Martin and Nicolas made many enhancements to the oboe, creating an "indoor" version similar to the shawm.

References

1677 births
1720 deaths
18th-century classical composers
18th-century French composers
18th-century French male musicians
French male classical composers
French Baroque composers
French classical oboists
Male oboists
17th-century male musicians